Robert Coleman-Senghor (1940 – April 9, 2011) was an American professor of English at Sonoma State University who served as mayor of Cotati, California for one year.  He died suddenly in the hospital from a blood clot (which two days earlier had caused a heart attack due to a torn aorta) entered his brain, causing hemorrhaging.

Life, education, and career 
Coleman-Senghor was born in 1940, in Amite City, Louisiana.  His family moved to California soon after.  He graduated from Berkeley High School.  He joined the United States Marine Corps.  After leaving the Marines, he attended University of California, Berkeley and later earned a master's degree from the University of San Francisco.

He met Gabi Schmitz while teaching at Sonoma State University. He married her in 1994, and had four sons.

Living in the Cotati area, he coached soccer and served as member of the local Parent-Teacher Association. He taught English as a Professor of California Cultural Studies at Sonoma State University.

His interest in politics led him to serve on the Cotati's Design Review Committee and Planning Commission. In 2008, there were three open seats on the City Council. Coleman-Senghor ran and got elected, getting 1,296 votes.  He was elected vice-mayor in 2009 and mayor in 2010.

While teaching, Coleman-Senghor experienced sudden chest pains.  He died two days later, on April 9, 2011.

Legacy

On November 7, 2013, his widow unveiled a permanent memorial to Coleman-Senghor. The memorial is located in Cotati's Veterans Park near the intersection of Old Redwood Highway and East Cotati Avenue.

See also 
 List of mayors of Cotati, California

References 

1940 births
2011 deaths
African-American educators
African-American mayors in California
Berkeley High School (Berkeley, California) alumni
Mayors of places in California
Military personnel from California
Military personnel from Louisiana
People from Amite City, Louisiana
People from Cotati, California
Sonoma State University faculty
University of San Francisco alumni
African-American city council members in California
African-American United States Navy personnel
20th-century African-American people
21st-century African-American people